

35 East Wacker, also known as the Jewelers' Building, is a 40-story  historic building in the Loop community area of Chicago, Illinois, United States, located at the intersection of Wabash Avenue and East Wacker Drive, facing the Chicago River. It was built from 1925 to 1927, and was co-designed by Joachim Giæver and Frederick P. Dinkelberg. At the time of its completion in 1927, it was the tallest building in the world outside New York City. Formerly the Pure Oil Building and North American Life Insurance Building, 35 East Wacker was listed in 1978 as a contributing property to the Michigan–Wacker Historic District on the National Register of Historic Places, and was designated a Chicago Landmark on February 9, 1994.

For its first 14 years, the building had a car lift that served the first 23 floors and facilitated safe transfers for jewelry merchants. Currently, the French-American Chamber of Commerce in Chicago is a tenant, and the showroom of architect Helmut Jahn was atop the building inside the dome, which was also once a restaurant  called the Stratosphere Club, often erroneously said to be run by Al Capone. (In reality, the Stratosphere Club opened in 1937, long after Capone was imprisoned and too late for the building to have been an illegal speakeasy.)  The building is currently being renovated, by Goettsch Partners, and the façade is being maintained, but the interiors converted into a more modern configuration.  Both the Chicago chapter of the American Institute of Architects and the City of Chicago have recognized the renovation project with awards.

Tenants
Mercury Records (1950–1973)
Feeding America
Sigma Chi Fraternity (1932-1951) 
SmithGroup
Serge Bertucci

In popular culture
The building was featured in the TV series Bob.
The building is featured in scenes of the 2005 film Batman Begins.
The 2011 film Transformers: Dark of the Moon features a climax set atop the building, which is heavily damaged, along with most of Chicago, in the giant robot battle that ensues.
In 2012, episode 2 of the first season of United States of America on the American History Channel featured the building's historic elevator, made by the Otis Elevator Company.
The building is shown in the TV series The Good Wife as the location of the law firm Lockhart/Gardner.
Emergency Call Ambulance (Sega 1999), Arcade racing videogame. The player drives by this building in the third case. In the game however, a burning gas station that has no relation to reality, is located at the bottom of this building.
The building is a prominent landmark within the fictional city of Lost Heaven in the video game Mafia, and appears also in the remake Mafia: Definitive Edition.

Gallery

References
Notes

External links

Official website

Skyscraper office buildings in Chicago
Office buildings completed in 1927
Historic district contributing properties in Illinois
Buildings and structures on the National Register of Historic Places in Chicago
Chicago school architecture in Illinois
1927 establishments in Illinois